The 1929–30 Sheffield Shield season was the 34th season of the Sheffield Shield, the domestic first-class cricket competition of Australia where the Victoria Cricket team won the championship.

Points system
5 points for a win
3 points for a win on first innings
2 points for a draw
1 point for a loss on first innings

Table

Statistics

Most Runs
Don Bradman - 894

Most Wickets
Clarrie Grimmett - 43

References

Sheffield Shield
Sheffield Shield
Sheffield Shield seasons